Rachel Claire Ward  (born 12 September 1957) is an English-Australian actress, film director, screenwriter and television director.

Early life
Ward was born in Cornwell near Chipping Norton, Oxfordshire, England, the daughter of Claire Leonora (née Baring) and the Hon. Peter Alistair Ward. Her grandfathers were William Ward, 3rd Earl of Dudley and the cricketer Giles Baring. Ward is also the great-granddaughter of William Ward, 2nd Earl of Dudley, Governor-General of Australia 1908–11, and sister of environmental campaigner and former actress Tracy Louise Ward, Duchess of Beaufort. She attended Hatherop Castle School, Hatherop, Gloucestershire, then the Byam Shaw School of Art in Kensington,  West London. She left school at age 16 to become a fashion and photography model. She briefly dated David Kennedy, son of Robert F. Kennedy.

Career
During her modelling career, she was featured on the covers of Vogue, Harper's & Queen, and Cosmopolitan magazines. After moving to the United States in 1977, she appeared in television advertisements such as the Lincoln Mercury "Cougar Girl" and Revlon's "Scoundrel Girl". In 1981, she received a Golden Globe Award nomination for "New Star of the Year" for her role in the film Sharky's Machine starring with Burt Reynolds. The following year, she starred in Dead Men Don't Wear Plaid with Steve Martin. Her big break came in 1983, when she starred opposite Richard Chamberlain as the lead role portraying Meggie Cleary in the television miniseries The Thorn Birds, for which she was nominated for a Golden Globe Award for Best Actress – Miniseries or Television Film. Ward assigns much of the credit for this breakthrough performance to acting coach Sandra Seacat, first for simply helping her get the job (after her disastrous first reading) and then for the quality of the finished performance, assembled over the course of a grueling five-month shooting schedule, while undergoing a simultaneous and no less grueling makeover program at the hands of Seacat. Also in 1983, U.S. audiences voted Ward one of the world's 10 most beautiful women. In 1984, she played Jess in the film noir remake Against All Odds, with Jeff Bridges. After filming Fortress in 1985, Ward then disappeared from film for a few years to study acting.

She reappeared in 1987 playing opposite her husband, Bryan Brown (whom she met on the set of The Thorn Birds), in The Umbrella Woman. In 2001, she was again nominated for the Golden Globe Award for Best Actress – Miniseries or Television Film for her role in On the Beach (2000). Also in 2001, Ward won the Australian Film Institute Award for Best Short Fiction Film for The Big House, and Best Australian Film at Flickerfest. The film also won the Film Critics Circle of Australia award, as did her 2003 film Martha's New Coat. That film also won the 2003 ATOM Award.

In 2003, a portrait of Ward by artist Jan Williamson won the Packing Room Prize at the Archibald Prize competition. In 2005, Ward was made a Member of the Order of Australia "for service to raising awareness of social justice through lobbying, mentoring and advocacy for the rights of disadvantaged and at-risk young people, and support for the Australian film and television industry".

In 2006, Ward acted in Kevin Connor's mini-series Blackbeard, made for the Hallmark Channel.

In 2007, Ward returned to television, headlining the new ABC drama Rain Shadow. She played a country veterinarian named Kate McDonald, a free spirit who confronts personal and professional obstacles in a rural, drought-affected town.

In 2009, she directed her first feature-length film titled Beautiful Kate, adapted by Ward from a 1982 Newton Thornburg novel, and premiered at the Sydney Film Festival.

Personal life
Ward has been married to Bryan Brown since 1983. They have three children: Rosie, Matilda and Joe.

Filmography

Film

Television

Other work

STAGE/THEATRE
 How To Get Ahead In Advertising (1989) (US)
 Hopping To Byzantium (1990)
 The Piccadilly Bushman (1998)

References

External links 

People from Chipping Norton
1957 births
Living people
Actresses from Oxfordshire
Australian television actresses
Australian television directors
Australian women television directors
Australian film actresses
Australian film directors
Australian women film directors
Australian screenwriters
Australian women screenwriters
English emigrants to Australia
Members of the Order of Australia
Rachel
Alumni of the Byam Shaw School of Art